is an arena in Kōriyama, Fukushima, Japan. It is the home arena of the Fukushima Firebonds of the B.League, Japan's professional basketball league.

Entertainment Events
ABBA
Stevie Wonder
Yellow Magic Orchestra

References

External links
Koriyama Sogo Gymnasium

Basketball venues in Japan
Fukushima Firebonds
Indoor arenas in Japan
Sports venues in Fukushima Prefecture
Kōriyama